Thomas Carlyle Ford (born August 27, 1961) is an American fashion designer and filmmaker. He launched his eponymous luxury brand in 2005, having previously served as the creative director at Gucci and Yves Saint Laurent. Ford wrote and directed the films A Single Man (2009) and Nocturnal Animals (2016). He currently serves as the chairman of the Board of the Council of Fashion Designers of America.

Born in Texas, Ford grew up in Houston and San Marcos. He later enrolled at Bard College at Simon's Rock before leaving prior to graduation. He later graduated from the New School with a degree in architecture.

Early life 
Thomas Carlyle Ford was born on August 27, 1961, in Austin, Texas, the son of realtors Shirley Burton (née Shirley Ann Thrasher) and Thomas David Ford (1932-2020). He spent his early life in the suburbs of Houston, Texas, and in San Marcos, outside Austin. He rearranged furniture in the house at 6, and gave his mother feedback on her hair and shoes. His family moved to Santa Fe, New Mexico, when he was 11. In Santa Fe, he entered St. Michael's High School and later moved to Santa Fe Preparatory School, from which he graduated in 1979.

At age 16, he enrolled at Bard College at Simon's Rock, but quickly dropped out. He moved to New York City to study art history at New York University (NYU). There he met Ian Falconer, who took him to Studio 54 for the first time. Ford dropped out after a year, focusing on acting in television commercials.

Ford began studying interior architecture at The New School's art and design college, Parsons The New School for Design, in New York City. He kept visiting Studio 54, where he realized he was gay. The club's disco-era glamor would be a major influence on his later designs. Before his last year at New School, Ford spent a year and a half in Paris, where he worked as an intern in Chloé's press office, inspiring his interest in fashion. He spent his final year at The New School studying fashion, but graduated with a degree in architecture.

Fashion career

Early career 
When interviewing for jobs after graduation, Ford said that he had attended The New School's Parsons division, but concealed that he graduated in architecture, and that his work at Chloé was a low-level public relations position. Despite his lack of experience in fashion, Ford called American designer Cathy Hardwick every day for a month in hopes of securing a job at her sportswear company. Hardwick eventually agreed to interview him. She later recalled the incident: "I had every intention of giving him no hope. I asked him who his favorite European designers were. He said, 'Armani and Chanel.' Months later I asked him why he said that, and he said, 'Because you were wearing something Armani.' Is it any wonder he got the job?" Ford worked as a design assistant for Hardwick for two years.

In 1988, Ford moved to Perry Ellis, where he knew both Robert McDonald, the company's president, and Marc Jacobs, its designer, socially. He worked at the company for two years, but grew tired of working in American fashion. In a later interview with The New York Times, he commented, "If I was ever going to become a good designer, I had to leave America. My own culture was inhibiting me. Too much style in America is tacky. It's looked down upon to be too stylish. Europeans, however, appreciate style."

At the time, Italian fashion house Gucci was struggling financially and was seeking to strengthen its women's ready-to-wear presence as a part of a brand overhaul. The company's creative director, Dawn Mello said, "no one would dream of wearing Gucci". In 1990, Mello hired Ford as the brand's chief women's ready-to-wear designer and Ford moved to Milan. "I was talking to a lot of people, and most didn't want the job," Mello said. "For an American designer to move to Italy to join a company that was far from being a brand would have been pretty risky." Ford and his longtime partner, fashion journalist Richard Buckley, relocated to Milan that September.

Ford's role at Gucci rapidly expanded; he was designing menswear within six months, and shoes soon after that. When Richard Lambertson left as design director in 1992, Ford took over his position, heading the brand's ready-to-wear, fragrances, image, advertising, and store design. In 1993, when he was in charge of designing eleven product lines, Ford worked eighteen-hour days. During these years, there were creative tensions between Ford and Maurizio Gucci, the company's chairman and 50% owner. According to Mello, "Maurizio always wanted everything to be round and brown, and Tom wanted to make it square and black." Though Maurizio Gucci wanted to fire Ford, Domenico De Sole insisted that he remain. Nonetheless, Ford's work during the early 1990s was primarily behind the scenes; his contributions to Gucci were overshadowed by those of Mello, who was the company's public face.

Creative Director of Gucci and Saint Laurent 

In 1994, Ford was promoted to Creative Director of Gucci. In his first year at the helm, he introduced Halston-style velvet hipsters, skinny satin shirts and car-finish metallic patent boots. In 1995, he brought in French stylist Carine Roitfeld and photographer Mario Testino to create a series of new ad campaigns for the company. Between 1995 and 1996, sales at Gucci increased by 90%. At one point, Ford was the largest individual shareholder of Gucci stock and options. By 1999, the house, which had been almost insolvent when Ford joined, was valued at more than $4 billion.

When Gucci acquired the house of Yves Saint Laurent (YSL) in 1999, Ford was named Creative Director of that label as well. Saint Laurent did not hide his displeasure with Ford's designs, stating "The poor man does what he can." During his time as creative director for YSL, Ford nonetheless won numerous Council of Fashion Designers of America Awards. Ford was able to pull the classic fashion house back into the mainstream. His advertising campaigns for the YSL fragrances Opium (with a red-haired Sophie Dahl naked wearing only a necklace and stiletto heels in a sexually suggestive pose) and YSL M7 (with martial arts champion Samuel de Cubber in complete full-frontal nudity) were controversial and provocative.

In April 2004, Ford parted ways with the Gucci group after he and CEO Domenico de Sole, who is credited as Ford's partner in Gucci's success, failed to agree with Pinault Printemps Redoute's boss over control of the Group. He has since referred to this experience as "devastating" and as a "midlife crisis" because he had "put everything into that for fifteen years". When Ford left in 2004, Gucci Group was valued at $10 billion. Four people were hired to split the work Ford had done.

Tom Ford label 

After leaving Gucci, Ford launched a line of menswear, beauty, eyewear, and accessories in 2006, named after himself. De Sole became chairman of the label. Ford has described "the Tom Ford customer" as international, cultured, well-traveled, and possessing disposable income. For women, he added "strong women, … intelligent women who know their own style".

First Lady Michelle Obama wore an ivory floor-length evening gown designed by Ford to Buckingham Palace in 2011. He has also dressed Beyoncé, Jennifer Lopez, Gwyneth Paltrow, Anne Hathaway, Daniel Craig, Tom Hanks, Johnny Depp, Ryan Gosling, Will Smith, Julianne Moore, Hugh Jackman, Jon Hamm, and Henry Cavill. Ford designed Daniel Craig's suits for his final four James Bond films: Quantum of Solace (2008), Skyfall (2012), Spectre (2015), and No Time to Die (2021).

In 2013, Ford was mentioned in Justin Timberlake's song "Suit & Tie", which was a collaboration with Jay-Z. Ford created the suits, shirts, and accessories for the Grammy winning "Suit & Tie" music video. He went on to dress Timberlake's 20/20 Experience World Tour, designing over 600 pieces for the tour. The same year, Jay-Z released a song titled "Tom Ford" with "Tom Ford" rapped numerous times within the song. Ford responded that he was flattered and "it means that one has really penetrated and made an impact on popular culture." Following the song's release, Ford received a huge spike in online search engine queries. The song would go on to sell over a million copies and become certified platinum.

In August 2022, The Wall Street Journal reported that Estée Lauder was in talks to purchase the Tom Ford brand for $3 billion or more, but that it was not the only company interested in buying it. This follows a report by Bloomberg in July that the company was for sale and suggested that this may act as a catalyst for additional involvement in film making.

Controversies 
Ford has been criticized for using naked women in various ad campaigns. Various journalists asserted that the ads were vulgar, sexist, or objectified women. One ad featured a nude woman holding a bottle of the perfume between her legs. Another featured a naked woman ironing a man's pants while he read a newspaper. A separate ad was banned in Italy.

Responding to criticism that he objectified women, Ford stated he is an "equal opportunity objectifier" and is "just as happy to objectify men". He argued "you can't show male nudity in our culture in the way you can show female nudity" and pointed out that he did a male nude ad while at Yves Saint Laurent which got pulled.

In 2014, Ford released a new product, called the "Penis Pendant Necklace". The product caused some controversy, with Christians calling it offensive due to the pendant being shaped similar to a Christian cross or crucifix. Ford replied that "it was not meant to be a cross, it was a phallus" and "people read into things what they want to".

In 2022, Ford criticized the Met Gala, stating the event had "turned into a costume party."

Career as a film director

A Single Man 

In March 2005, Ford announced the launch of his film production company, Fade to Black. In 2009 he made his directorial debut with A Single Man, based on the novel of the same name by Christopher Isherwood. The drama stars Colin Firth as an LA-based college professor who is gay, alongside Julianne Moore, Nicholas Hoult and Matthew Goode. The novel was adapted by David Scearce and Ford; Ford was also one of the producers.

A Single Man premiered on September 11, 2009, at the 66th Venice International Film Festival, where it was nominated for top award the Golden Lion. Colin Firth was awarded the Volpi Cup as Best Actor for his performance. He won a BAFTA Award for Best Actor in a Leading Role, and was nominated for an Academy Award, Golden Globe, Independent Spirit Award and Screen Actors Guild Award. The film won AFI Film of the Year and the GLAAD Media Award for Outstanding Film – Wide Release.

Other nominations for the film included two further Golden Globe categories: Julianne Moore for Best Supporting Actress, and Abel Korzeniowski for Best Original Score. At the Independent Spirit Awards, the film was nominated for Best First Feature and Best First Screenplay. Ford and Scearce also received a nomination for Best Adapted Screenplay at the Broadcast Film Critics Association Awards.

Nocturnal Animals 
In 2015, Ford became attached to direct Nocturnal Animals, an adaptation of the Austin Wright novel Tony and Susan. The film was released in 2016. Jake Gyllenhaal and Amy Adams played the lead roles of Tony and Susan, and Michael Shannon, Armie Hammer, Aaron Taylor-Johnson, and Isla Fisher co-starred.

The film received praise from critics, as well as winning the Grand Jury Prize at the Venice Film Festival. The film has an approval rating of 72% on Rotten Tomatoes, based on 143 reviews, with an average rating of 7.1/10, and the site's critical consensus reading: "Well-acted and lovely to look at, Nocturnal Animals further underscores writer-director Tom Ford's distinctive visual and narrative skill."

Personal life 
Ford married Richard Buckley in 2014, a journalist and former editor in chief of Vogue Hommes International; they had been in a relationship since meeting in 1986. The couple have a son who was born in September 2012 via gestational surrogate. The family lived in Italy, where Ford moved from New York in 1990, and in London for 17 years. They lived in his residences in New York, Los Angeles, Santa Fe, and London. Ford and Buckley have owned smooth fox terriers, which have appeared on the runway and in his film A Single Man. Ford also has two nephews and a niece, the children of his sister Jennifer.

Ford constructed a 24,000-acre private tract designed by Japanese architect Tadao Ando, in Santa Fe. It is called Cerro Pelon Ranch and has additional structures that were designed by Marmol Radziner. The property also has a fictional town known as Silverado that is used as a filming location for Western movies.

He told Vogue he had adopted a vegan diet after viewing a Netflix documentary called What the Health. As of 2019, he has been a teetotaler and has been open about using fillers and Botox.

He has said in multiple interviews that his first lover was the artist Ian Falconer, who went on to write and illustrate the very popular Olivia the Pig children's book series. Ford maintains that he and Falconer are still good friends; decades after their breakup, Ford lent Falconer's last name to the title character of his first movie, A Single Man (in the source novel the character originally only had a first name).

Richard Buckley died on September 19, 2021, at the age of 72 after a long illness.

Politics 
Ford is a Democrat. He opposed America's invasion of Iraq in 2003, stating that it made him feel "ashamed to be an American". His comment drew public criticism within America. He hosted a fundraiser for Barack Obama. He voted for Hillary Clinton in the 2016 US general election.

Ford has advocated for federal recognition of same-sex marriage in the United States. In a 2009 interview, he said he preferred the term "civil partnership" for both opposite-sex and same-sex partnerships, and to leave "marriage" to religion to decide.

Ford maintains a policy of not dressing politicians regardless of party.

I think that whoever is the President, or the First Lady, should be wearing clothes at a price point that are accessible to most Americans, and wearing clothes made in America. My clothes are made in Italy, they're very, very expensive. I don't think most women or men in our country can relate to that, and I think the First Lady or the President should represent all people.

Ford considers "obsession with political correctness" as something which negatively impacts modern fashion designers. He has stated that "Cancel culture inhibits design because rather than feeling free, the tendency is to start locked into a set of rules. Everything is now considered appropriation. We used to be able to celebrate other cultures. Now you can’t do that."

Public image and legacy 
Ford has been included in several best-dressed lists, such as International Best Dressed List, The Guardians "The 50 best-dressed over-50s", and British GQs "50 Best Dressed Men in Britain 2015". He was featured on the cover of the 2011 spring/summer issue of Another Man, giving his opinion on what makes the modern day gentleman. He has been called a "fashion icon" and a "style icon", and he was included in "All-TIME 100 Fashion Icons" list. He won many awards including several VH1/Vogue Fashion Awards and Council of Fashion Designers of America (CFDA) Awards. In 2014, the CFDA awarded him the Geoffery Beene Lifetime Achievement Award.

While Ford was in a monogamous relationship for many years, he "continue[d] to promote himself with a youthful and sexually charged image". He is known for sexy clothes, making provocative statements, and creating racy advertisements. Ford's designs convey a "sophisticated sex appeal" and he has been credited for "bringing sexy back". His advertisement campaigns have drawn controversy for use of nudity and "provocative sexual imagery". Ford is also known to pose with celebrities and models in his ad campaigns. He has been called the "King of Sex" and "the straightest gay man in the world".

Ford saved Gucci from near bankruptcy and transformed it into a fashion powerhouse. His decade as the creative director was hailed as a "golden era" for Gucci. He turned the brand around, replacing the "grunge look" with "sexy, yet sophisticated, clothes". He is known for his bold designs. The New York Magazine wrote "Every season, Ford created an 'It' piece, a must-have, a season-defining trend, photographed to death, knocked off ad nauseam." Ford says it is important for designers to be contemporary and current with the changing standard of beauty.

In 2004, Ford published an eponymous monograph, detailing his early career and his design work for Gucci and Yves Saint Laurent from 1990 to 2004. In 2021, seventeen years later, Ford published a follow-up volume entitled Tom Ford 002, which described his career from 2005 including the creation of his own fashion label and the production of his two films. Both books are published by Rizzoli International Publications and co-authored by fashion journalist Bridget Foley, with forewords by Anna Wintour.

In popular culture 

In September 2013, hip-hop artist Jay-Z released the song “Tom Ford” as a single from his album Magna Carta Holy Grail. Ford responded favorably to the song saying, "Who would not be flattered to have an entire Jay-Z track named after them? I mean, [...] it's pretty rare that something like that happens. It's a kind of validation of one's work, as it means that one has really penetrated and made an impact on popular culture." The song was nominated for 56th Grammy Award for Best Rap Performance in 2014.

In the 2021 film House of Gucci directed by Ridley Scott, Ford was portrayed by actor Reeve Carney.

Awards and nominations 
Ford has been recognized by important design and cultural councils worldwide, including the Cooper Hewitt Design Museum and Time.
 1995: International Award – Council of Fashion Designers of America (CFDA)
 1997: People Magazine's 50 Most Beautiful People
 1999: Style Icon Award – Elle Style Awards UK
 2000: Best International Designer – VH1/Vogue Awards
 2000: Fashion Editors Club of Japan Award
 2000: British GQ International Man of the Year Award
 2000: Superstar Award – Fashion Group International
 2001: Womenswear Designer of the Year – CFDA
 2001: Best Fashion Designer – Time Magazine
 2001: Designer of the Year – GQ USA
 2002: Accessory Designer of the Year Award for Yves Saint-Laurent – CFDA
 2003: Fashion Design Achievement Award – Cooper-Hewitt Design Museum's National Design Awards
 2004: Board of Directors Special Tribute – CFDA
 2004: Rodeo Drive Walk of Style Award
 2004: International Best Dressed List Hall of Fame
 2005: André Leon Talley Lifetime Achievement Award – Savannah College of Art & Design
 2006: Accessory Brand Launch – Accessories Council Excellence Awards
 2007: GLAAD Media Awards – Vito Russo Award
 2007: DNR's Person of the Year
 2008: Menswear Designer of the Year – CFDA
 2009: Venice Film Festival – Golden Lion for A Single Man (nominee)
 2009: Venice Film Festival – Queer Lion for A Single Man
 2009: Critics' Choice Awards – Best Adapted Screenplay for A Single Man (nominee)
 2009: Independent Spirit Awards – Best First Screenplay for A Single Man (nominee)
 2009: Independent Spirit Awards – Best First Feature for A Single Man (nominee)
 2009: Honored as one of GQ USA's Men of the Year
 2009: GQ Germany Man of the Year
 2010: GLAAD Media Awards – Outstanding Film Wide Release for A Single Man
 2010: Menswear Designer of the Year – CFDA (nominee)
 2012: All-TIME 100 Fashion Icons – Member
 2013: Named one of the 50 best-dressed over 50s by The Guardian.
 2014: Geoffrey Beene Lifetime Achievement Award – CFDA
 2015: Menswear Designer of the Year – CFDA
 2015: Named in British GQs 50 best-dressed men in Britain
 2016: Venice Film Festival – Grand Jury Prize for Nocturnal Animals
 2016: Satellite Auteur Award

Filmography

Bibliography

References

External links

 
 
 
 Tom Ford biography at London Fashion Week, British Fashion Council.
 Can also buy from Fin and Mo

 
1961 births
Living people
American University of Paris alumni
American fashion businesspeople
American fashion designers
American film producers
Artists from Austin, Texas
Artists from Santa Fe, New Mexico
American gay artists
High fashion brands
LGBT film directors
LGBT fashion designers
LGBT people from New Mexico
LGBT people from Texas
LGBT producers
Luxury brands
Parsons School of Design alumni
Menswear designers
Creative directors
People from Austin, Texas
American LGBT screenwriters
American male screenwriters
American gay writers
Texas Democrats
New Mexico Democrats
Film directors from New Mexico
Film directors from Texas
Screenwriters from New York (state)
Screenwriters from New Mexico
Screenwriters from Texas
Gucci people
American cosmetics businesspeople
Gucci